Skinner's Finish (also known as Skinny's Finish) is a surviving 1908 silent film comedy short directed by Edwin S. Porter and produced by the Edison Manufacturing Company.

The film is preserved in the Library of Congress collection.

Cast
Charles Inslee
William V. Ranous

References

External links

1908 films
American silent short films
Edison Manufacturing Company films
Films directed by Edwin S. Porter
American black-and-white films
Silent American comedy films
1908 comedy films
1900s American films